The Longemont Shanghai is a skyscraper and mixed use building in the Changning District of Shanghai, China. It contains the Changfeng Hotel as well as office space.

See also
 List of tallest buildings in Shanghai

External links
 
 

Commercial buildings completed in 2005
Skyscraper hotels in Shanghai
Arquitectonica buildings